Cypress Creek Emergency Medical Services (CCEMS) is a former emergency medical service provider in North Harris County, within greater Houston, Texas. Cypress Creek EMS was brought by Viking Enterprises, DBA City Ambulance Service in late 2022. All ambulances in use by CCEMS are Mobile Intensive Care Units (MICU), with at least one Paramedic, making all ambulances ALS  units.

History

In  November 1974, a tragic event occurred in which a man died from a heart attack without pre-hospital care. Afterward, The FM 1960 Community (The stretch of FM 1960 between I-45 and SH 249), took the initiative to form an emergency medical service  which came to be known as Cypress Creek EMS, named after the large creek that runs through the area. CCEMS was chartered as a non-profit corporation by the state of Texas on July 25, 1975. https://ccemsnews.com/2016/07/20/cypress-creek-turns-41/

The community desperately raised funds to establish the service and they soon purchased the first ambulance, which arrived on December 14, 1975. At this time, all of the CCEMS staff were volunteers with no reimbursement for their services. To this day, volunteers are a large and integral part of the staff and they range from non-medical drivers to emergency medical technicians to paramedics.

The service relied heavily on donations and fundraisers as it did not receive government funding. Third-Party billing was initiated in 1993 and allowed Cypress Creek EMS to bill insured patients to help with reimbursement. CCEMS was previously affiliated with Emergency Services District 11 and about 51% of its funding was derived from tax dollars.

One of the notable things about CCEMS is its bright red uniform shirts. CCEMS is one of the very few services in the country that wears red. In order to keep an image of professionalism, members wear the uniforms year-round as opposed to other services who may permit their members to wear shorts or polo shirts during the summertime.

The main fleet today consists of twenty-two MICU Type I ambulances, two supervisor vehicles, and education ambulance, and one urban terrain vehicle (UTV).

The first responder program allows qualified members to respond to calls in their surrounding area before a medic unit arrives.

CCEMS also has a bike team that performs first response at large events such as parades and festivals.

In 2017, CCEMS along with its partner ESD 48 Fire Department in the Katy area became the first ground system in the country to carry whole blood in the field 24/7/365.

Cypress Creek EMS is not in direct connection with Cypress Creek Volunteer Fire Department. They are however affiliates and CCEMS provides EMS services to the CCVFD area. There is a widespread misconception that the two services are one in the same.

In September, 2020, Cypress Creek EMS was served with a 360 day notice that their contract was being cancelled by Harris County ESD 11

Cypress Creek EMS signed a Contract to be CHI St Luke's Health System's EMS Transport provider back in September of 2021. Cypress Creek EMS has shifted its EMS model into providing innovative and exceptional care that was provided in a 911 system to providing that same care or better in the Interfacility Critical Care Transport.

As of May 31, 2022, Cypress Creek EMS has ceased all operations.

As of late 2022, Cypress Creek EMS was brought by Viking Enterprises, DBA City Ambulance Service.

Education

The Charles R. Hooks Education Center located on Five Forks Dr, is a state of the art education facility which provides training programs for Emergency Care Attendants, EMT-Basic, and Paramedics. Cypress Creek EMS also offers training by the American Heart Association guidelines in:

Heartsaver First Aid,
Friends and Family CPR,
Heartsaver CPR,
Healthcare Provider CPR.
In 2015 the American Heart Association recognized Cypress Creek EMS with a coveted Gold Award for Severe Heart Attack Pre-Hospital Care.

Cypress Creek EMS also has a longstanding training program for Tactical Medics, which allows trained emergency medical technicians to provide support to tactical law enforcement officers. Firefighters, Police Officers and Medics come from all over the world to attend the twice a year training sessions.

In 2015, CCEMS Chief Operating Officer and Tactical Medic Instructor Wren Nealy was named Tactical Officer of the Year.

In 2016, The CCEMS Lead Paramedic Instructor was named the Texas EMS Educator of the Year
In 2017, the CCEMS Communications Center was named Texas Telecommunicator of the Year.

Communication Center

The Communication Center, or Comm Center for short, is the primary communication link between the public and CCEMS. When an individual dials 911 and it is determined to be a medical emergency within the service district of CCEMS, it is rerouted to the CCEMS Communication Center. The dispatcher then asks a series of questions to determine the situation. Once a determinant is formed, an ambulance is dispatched to the location. The dispatcher remains on the phone with the caller and asks additional questions to gain information about the event as well as determine the level of priority. The dispatcher also uses the information gained to determine whether the responding crew will need additional assistance such as Fire Department, Law Enforcement, Life Flight, or help from the on-duty supervisor. At this time, the ambulance is en route and the information gained by the dispatcher is communicated to the ambulance crew.

From when the crew is en route to the emergency, to when the crew is cleared from the hospital, they remain in contact with the comm center through portable radios, and cell phones. All trucks also have a Mobile data terminal (MDT) that allows them to transfer information without using online communication. The CCEMS Comm Center also works with other dispatch centers such as the Harris County Sheriff's Department and surrounding area EMS dispatch centers to provide and receive mutual aid.

The Comm Center also dispatches fire apparatus in addition to ambulances in the area.

The CCEMS Comm Center uses the Field Response Guide by the National Academy of Emergency Medical Dispatch.

Awards
Best Advanced Life Support System in Texas – 1985
Paramedic Emergency Medical Service of the Year for the United States – 1986
Excellence in Health Care Award – 1995 
Texas EMS Provider of the Year – 2011
Texas Medical Director of the Year – 2009, 2011
American Heart Association Gold Award – 2015
Fastest Door to Balloon Inflation Time – 2012, 2013, 2014, 2016 (Houston Methodist Hospital Willowbrook)
Fastest Door to tPA Time for Stroke Care − 2012, 2013, 2014. 2015, 2016 (Houston Methodist Hospital Willowbrook)
National Tactical Officers Association TEMS Award - 2015
Texas EMS Educator of the Year - 2016
Texas EMS Telecommunicator of the Year - 2017

2019 Scandal

In February 2019, news broke of publicly funded employees repairing non-fleet vehicles using facilities and equipment intended to service ambulances.

External links
Official Cypress Creek EMS Website
CCEMS Special Operations Group Tactical Medic Page
{http://www.ccemsnews.com Official CCEMS News Page}

References

Ambulance services in the United States
Organizations established in 1975
1975 establishments in Texas
Organizations based in Houston
Medical and health organizations based in Texas